Terence D. Robinson (date of birth and death unknown) was a male wrestler who competed for England.

Wrestling career
He represented England and won a bronze medal, in the bantamweight category of -57 kg , at the 1970 British Commonwealth Games in Edinburgh, Scotland.

References

Date of birth missing
Possibly living people
English male wrestlers
Wrestlers at the 1970 British Commonwealth Games
Commonwealth Games bronze medallists for England
Commonwealth Games medallists in wrestling
Medallists at the 1970 British Commonwealth Games